The 1973 State of the Union Address was given to the 93rd United States Congress on Tuesday, February 2, 1973, by Richard Nixon, the 37th president of the United States. In the letter, Nixon wrote:

References

State of the Union addresses
Speeches by Richard Nixon
Presidency of Richard Nixon
93rd United States Congress
State of the Union Address
State of the Union Address
State of the Union Address
February 1973 events in the United States